Megumi Nakamura (born 24 August 2000) is a Japanese professional footballer who plays as a forward for WE League club AC Nagano Parceiro.

Club career 
Nakamura made her WE League debut on 26 September 2021.

References 

Living people
2000 births
Women's association football forwards
WE League players
Japanese women's footballers
Association football people from Nagano Prefecture
AC Nagano Parceiro Ladies players